Kenneth Baillie , Professor of Experimental Medicine at the University of Edinburgh, is a medical scientist working in genomics in critical care medicine and respiratory infection.

Research
Through his work in genomics, he has made several discoveries including finding multiple human genes that are important in critical illness caused by influenza. and COVID-19. He started the GenOMICC (Genetics of Mortality in Critical Care) study in 2016, to study genetic predisposition to a wide range of severe infections. In 2020 he expanded the study and used it to discover human genes that cause susceptibility to severe Covid-19 This discovery led directly to the finding that a new drug, baricitinib, is an effective treatment for severe Covid-19. He discovered a further 23 genes underlying severe Covid-19 in 2021.

He also played a leading role in designing, setting up and delivering the RECOVERY Trial that discovered four effective treatments for critical Covid-19. He was one of the first to systematically review the evidence for steroid treatment in Covid-19, warning of the need for trials in 2020, and contributing to the discovery of the steroid, dexamethasone, works as a highly effective treatment. He led the UK ISARIC4C consortium, which coordinated UK-wide clinical research to understand Covid-19

In 2001 he led the first Apex (altitude physiology expeditions) research expedition to a high altitude laboratory in Bolivia, and discovered that  acute mountain sickness is two separate conditions, leading to a new international consensus definition of the disease.

Guidelines and Policy
He has worked with WHO on influenza, MERS, Ebola and COVID-19, conceiving and drafting a research protocol for global preparedness and harmonisation that was used for the first clinical description of COVID-19. During the Covid-19 pandemic he advised the UK government on clinical management of the outbreak, and advocated for public health measures to contain the pandemic.

Awards and honours
Baillie is a fellow of the Academy of Medical Sciences and a Fellow of the Royal Society of Edinburgh(FRSE). He has received several awards from the public, including the Herald newspaper's Heroes of the Year (2020) and a Pride of Scotland "special recognition" award in 2021. In 2022 he was awarded the University of Edinburgh Chancellor's Award for Research. He is one of the ISI Highly Cited Researchers

Selected publications

References

External links
 . J.K. Baillie online CV

Academics of the University of Edinburgh
Living people
21st-century British medical doctors
Fellows of the Royal College of Anaesthetists
Fellows of the Royal College of Physicians of Edinburgh
Fellows of the Royal Society of Edinburgh
Fellows of the Academy of Medical Sciences (United Kingdom)

Year of birth missing (living people)
Living people